The 1999 Virginia Tech Hokies football team represented Virginia Polytechnic Institute and State University in the 1999 NCAA Division I-A football season. Virginia Tech competed as a member of the Big East Conference. The Hokies were led by Frank Beamer in his 13th year as head coach. Virginia Tech finished the regular season undefeated but lost in the national championship game to the Florida State Seminoles.

Regular season summary
Michael Vick led the Hokies to an 11–0 regular season and to the Bowl Championship Series national title game in the Sugar Bowl against Florida State. Although Virginia Tech lost 46–29, Vick was able to bring the team back from a 21-point deficit to take a 29–28 lead into the fourth quarter. During the season, Vick appeared on the cover of an ESPN The Magazine issue.

Vick led the NCAA in passing efficiency that year, setting a record for a freshman (180.4), which was also good enough for the third-highest all-time mark (Colt Brennan holds the record at 185.9 from his 2006 season at Hawaii). Vick was awarded an ESPY Award as the nation's top college player, and won the first-ever Archie Griffin Award as college football's most valuable player. He was invited to the 1999 Heisman Trophy presentation and finished third in the voting behind Ron Dayne and Joe Hamilton. Vick's third-place finish matched the highest finish ever by a freshman up to that point, first set by Herschel Walker in 1980 (Adrian Peterson later broke that mark, finishing second in 2004).

Schedule

Roster

Rankings

Game summaries

James Madison

Source: Box Score

Michael Vick ran for three touchdowns in the first 22 minutes of the game, but left due to an injury after he somersaulted into the end zone on the third score. The freshman had run for 54 yards, and thrown for 110 yards in leading the Hokies to a 24–0 lead that turned into a 47–0 win.

UAB

Source: Box Score

Clemson

Source: Box Score

at Virginia

Source: Box Score

at Rutgers

Source: Box Score

No. 16 Syracuse

Source: Box Score

at Pittsburgh

Source: Box Score

at West Virginia

Source: Box Score

No. 19 Miami (FL)

Source: Box Score

at Temple

Source: Box Score

No. 22 Boston College

Source: Box Score

vs. No. 1 Florida State (Sugar Bowl)

Source: Box Score

Players in the NFL

The following players were drafted into professional football following the season.

Awards and honors

 Michael Vick – Big East Rookie of the Year, Big East Offensive Player of the Year, First-Team All-American, Archie Griffin Award, Heisman Trophy finalist (3rd)
 Corey Moore – Big East Defensive Player of the Year, Unanimous First-Team All-American, Bronko Nagurski Trophy, Lombardi Award
 Shayne Graham – Big East Special Teams Player of the Year
 Frank Beamer – Big East Coach of the Year, AFCA Coach of the Year, AP Coach of the Year, Bobby Dodd Coach of the Year Award, Eddie Robinson Coach of the Year, George Munger Award, Paul "Bear" Bryant Award, Walter Camp Coach of the Year Award

References

Virginia Tech
Virginia Tech Hokies football seasons
Big East Conference football champion seasons
Lambert-Meadowlands Trophy seasons
Virginia Tech Hokies football